The 2004 European Parliament election was the United Kingdom's part of the wider 2004 European Parliament election which was held between 10 and 13 June 2004 in the 25 member states of the European Union. The United Kingdom's part of this election was held on Thursday 10 June 2004. The election also coincided with the 2004 local elections and the London Assembly and mayoral elections. In total, 78 Members of the European Parliament were elected from the United Kingdom using proportional representation.

The Conservative Party and the Labour Party both polled poorly. The Conservatives experienced their second-lowest ever recorded vote share in a national election (even less than their 1832 nadir, although the party would do worse still in the 2014 and 2019 elections), and Labour their lowest since 1918. The UK Independence Party (UKIP) saw a large increase in support, increasing its number of MEPs from 3 to 12 and on popular vote pushed the Liberal Democrats, who themselves had increased their representation from 10 to 12 seats into fourth place. In Northern Ireland, Sinn Féin beat the SDLP in the polls and took its first Northern Ireland seat.

Background

Electoral system
The United Kingdom elected 78 Members of the European Parliament using proportional representation. The United Kingdom was divided into twelve multi-member constituencies. The eleven of these regions which form Great Britain used a closed-list party list system method of proportional representation, calculated using the D'Hondt method. Northern Ireland used the Single Transferable Vote (STV). As a consequence of the 2004 enlargement of the European Union, the number of seats allocated to the United Kingdom was fewer than in 1999.

It was the first European election to be held in the United Kingdom using postal-only voting in four areas: the North East, North West, Yorkshire and the Humber, and East Midlands
regions.

Regional seat allocations
A combination of the effects of the Treaty of Nice and the 2004 enlargement of the European Union meant that the number of seats allocated to the United Kingdom for the 2004 election was reduced from the 87 MEPs allocated for the 1999 election to 78 MEPs.

As a result of the successful challenge of Matthews v United Kingdom before the European Court of Human Rights in 1999 residents of Gibraltar, voted in the European Parliament election for the first time, as part of the South West England region.

1 Includes Gibraltar, the only British overseas territory which is part of the EU.

Results

Turnout for all the regions was 38.2% on an electorate of 44,157,267 (43,084,598 in Great Britain and 1,072,669 in Northern Ireland). The Conservatives and Labour both polled poorly. The Conservatives, although getting a vote share 4.1% greater than Labour, experienced their lowest vote share in a national election since 1832. Labour's vote share was its lowest since 1918. Labour's decline in votes was regarded as being largely due to widespread public dissatisfaction about the Iraq War and (as with the Conservatives) the increased popularity of UK Independence Party (UKIP). UKIP saw a large increase in support, increasing its number of MEPs from 3 to 12, drawing level with the Liberal Democrats, who themselves had increased their representation from 10 to 12 seats. UKIP polled higher than the Liberal Democrats to push the latter into fourth place.

Turnout was lowest in Scotland, which did not hold local elections on the same day. In Scotland, Labour topped the poll, followed by the Scottish National Party (SNP). The Conservatives' share of the vote declined by 2 percent, making it the region with the smallest swing against them.

Wales was the only region were Labour increased its share of the vote compared to 1999. The Conservatives managed to make gains pushing Plaid Cymru into third and whose share of the vote fell by 12 percentage points relative to 1999. Similarly UKIP narrowly beat the Liberal Democrats into fourth place. Wales was the region where the Green Party polled their lowest share of the vote.

United Kingdom

All parties listed.

†Loss/gain figures for seats are losses/gains versus the 1999 notional result, as the number of MEPs overall fell.

Great Britain

Summary of the election results for Great Britain

All parties listed.

†Loss/gain figures for seats are losses/gains versus the 1999 notional result, as the number of MEPs overall fell.

Gibraltar

Gibraltar participated in the United Kingdom's election for the first time in 2004 as part of the South West England constituency. Gibraltar is a British overseas territory (BOT) and therefore is under the jurisdiction and sovereignty of the United Kingdom but does not form part of it. Gibraltar is however part of the EU, the only BOT to be so. Following however, the result of the successful challenge of Matthews v United Kingdom before the European Court of Human Rights in 1999 residents of Gibraltar were given the right to vote in the European Parliament elections. The British government decided not to give Gibraltar its own seat due to its small electorate of just over 20,000 which would have meant with just one seat Gibraltar would have been over-represented by about 30 times the average.

None of the main Gibraltar political parties contested the election, so voters chose from United Kingdom party lists. However, Lyana Armstrong-Emery of Gibraltar's Reform Party had a place on a joint list with the Green Party. In addition both the leader of the Conservative Party, Michael Howard, and his deputy, Michael Ancram, campaigned in Gibraltar.

Turnout in Gibraltar was 57.5%, higher than the 37.6% for the South West England electoral region as a whole. The Conservative Party polled over two-thirds of the Gibraltar vote, with no other party exceeding 10% support.

Northern Ireland
Turnout in Northern Ireland was 51.2%. Sinn Féin beat the SDLP in the polls and took its first Northern Ireland seat. Sinn Féin also won a seat in the corresponding elections in the Republic of Ireland. Sinn Féin and the DUP increased their shares of the vote relative to the 1999 European Parliament elections, while the shares for both the SDLP and the UUP fell. This was also the final election in which a Unionist candidate topped the poll in Northern Ireland. Jim Allister of the DUP and Bairbre de Brún of Sinn Féin were elected in the first round while Jim Nicholson of the UUP was elected in the third stage, after the votes of the other candidates were reallocated.

Summary of the election results for Northern Ireland

MEPs defeated
Labour
David Bowe (Yorkshire and the Humber)
Bill Miller (Scotland)
Brian Simpson (North West England) - returned to the European Parliament in September 2006 and subsequently defended his seat in 2009.
Mo O'Toole (North East England)
Mark F. Watts (South East England)

Conservative
Jacqueline Foster (North West England) - was subsequently reelected in the 2009 election.
Alexander Macmillan (South West England)
Roy Perry (South East England)
Ian Twinn (London) - only took seat on 21 October 2003 after the ill-health resignation of Lord Bethell.

Plaid Cymru
Eurig Wyn (Wales)

Aftermath
Both Tony Blair and Michael Howard faced criticism for their results with then Secretary of State for Health John Reid calling the results "disappointing" for Labour and "disastrous" for the Conservatives.

Shortly after the election UKIP's Robert Kilroy-Silk, who was credited with raising the profile of the party during the election, was interviewed by Channel 4 television about leadership ambitions, Kilroy-Silk did not deny having ambitions to lead the party, but stressed that Roger Knapman would lead it into the next general election. However, the next day, on Breakfast with Frost, he criticised Knapman's leadership. After further disagreement with the leadership, Kilroy-Silk resigned the UKIP whip in the European Parliament on 27 October 2004. Initially, he remained a member, while seeking a bid for the party leadership. However, this was not successful and he resigned completely from UKIP on 20 January 2005, calling it a "joke". Two weeks later, he founded his own party, Veritas, taking a number of UKIP members, including both of the London Assembly members, with him.

UKIP formed a new European Parliament Group, Independence/Democracy which was co-chaired by Nigel Farage and Hanne Dahl.

See also
2005 United Kingdom general election
List of political parties in the United Kingdom

Notes

References

External links
 European Election News by European Election Law Association (Eurela)
 Guide and results at the UK Office of the European Parliament
 Guide and links Richard Kimber's at Political Science Resources

Manifestos and documents
 Guardian (newspaper): incomplete collection of manifestos
 Conservative manifesto
 European Greens manifesto; Successes of the Greens in the European Parliament; A Green Contract for Europe; European Election Manifesto: Green Party of England and Wales Manifesto: Northern Ireland
 Labour document
 Liberal Democrat manifesto
 Democratic Unionist Party manifesto
 Social Democratic and Labour Party manifesto
 Socialist Environmental Alliance manifesto
 Ulster Unionist Party manifesto European manifesto (ED)
 Scottish National Party manifesto
 Plaid Cymru / The Party of Wales Manifesto

European Parliament election
United Kingdom
European Parliament election
2004